Syed Alimuddin Ahmad (1884 - 1920), popularly known as Master Saheb, was a Bengali bodybuilder and wrestler. He participated in the anti-British independence movement as an underground activist and revolutionary, as a part of the Dhaka Mukti Sangha organisation. Ahmed rose to prominence after the organisation was absorbed into Subhas Chandra Bose's Bengal Volunteers during the mayorship of Chittaranjan Das in Calcutta.

Early life and family 
Syed Alimuddin Ahmad was born in 1884 to a Bengali Muslim family of Syeds in Ashiq Jamadar Lane, Dhaka. His father, Syed Amiruddin, was a tailor by profession and owned a small tailoring shop. He and his siblings were educated in the local primary school and then at madrasas, which was why he was often referred to by the titles of Munshi or Moulvi by his comrades. Ahmad then enrolled at the Dhaka College. Following his father's death, he started working as a home tutor. Ahmad was a devout Sunni Muslim.

Activism 
The start of Ahmad's activism roughly coincided with the 1905 Partition of Bengal movement. As an accomplice of Hemchandra Ghosh, he joined Ghosh's organisation, the Dhaka Mukti Sangha. During World War I, many revolutionaries and activists were arrested by the British Army though others such as Ahmad continued to keep the organisation alive underground. Ahmad provided shelter for numerous rebels and assisted them with weaponry. He prevented communal riots in Dacca during his leadership and had recruited many young people in the city. Among his notable disciples was Abdul Jabbar (revolutionary)|Abdul Jabbar. Ahmad continued his anti-imperial activities in hiding to avoid police arrests. The colonial police were never able to capture him.

Death and legacy 
Alimuddin Ahmad died of tuberculosis in his early thirties in 1920, which was a major setback for the Mukti Sangha. Alimuddin Street in Calcutta was named after him.

References 

Indian independence movement
Indian independence activists from Bangladesh
Bangladeshi revolutionaries
1920 deaths
1884 births
19th-century Indian Muslims
20th-century Indian Muslims
20th-century Bengalis
19th-century Bengalis
People from Dhaka
Sunni Muslims
Tuberculosis deaths in Bangladesh
20th-century deaths from tuberculosis